Hands of the Ripper is a 1971 British horror film, directed by Peter Sasdy for Hammer Film Productions. It was written by L. W. Davidson from a story by Edward Spencer Shew, and produced by Aida Young. The film was released in the U.S. as a double feature with Twins of Evil.

Plot

The young daughter of Jack the Ripper is witness to the brutal murder of her mother by her father. Fifteen years later, she is a troubled young woman who is seemingly possessed by the spirit of her late father. While in a psychotic trance she continues his murderous killing spree, but has no recollection of the events afterwards. A sympathetic psychiatrist takes her in and is convinced he can cure her condition. However, he soon regrets his decision...

Cast
Eric Porter as Dr. John Pritchard
Angharad Rees as Anna
Jane Merrow as Laura
Keith Bell as Michael Pritchard
Derek Godfrey as Mr. Dysart
Dora Bryan as Mrs. "Granny" Golding
Marjorie Rhodes as Mrs. Bryant
Lynda Baron as Long Liz
Marjie Lawrence as Dolly, the maid
Margaret Rawlings as Madame Bullard
Elizabeth MacLennan as Mrs. Wilson 
Barry Lowe as Mr. Wilson
April Wilding as Catherine
Douglas Chippendale as Jack the Ripper

Production

The film features British actor Eric Porter as the doctor, and also stars Jane Merrow, Keith Bell and Derek Godfrey. It has an early starring role for Angharad Rees.

It was filmed at Pinewood Studios, with some location work at St. Paul's Cathedral, London.

Critical reception 

Film critic Leonard Maltin gave the film 2 1/2 out of a possible 4 stars. In his review he stated that the film had "[a] good atmosphere and solid performances, but after a good start, dissolves into a series of bloody murders." The Hammer Story: The Authorised History of Hammer Films wrote that the film "expertly mixes the sophistication expected of Hammer's films with the gore its new audiences demanded."
Andy Boot considers the film "flawed, and so close to the fag end of Gothic that it could almost be a parody", but that it is "nonetheless a film well worth watching". He opines that Peter Sasdy "atoned for his appalling Countess Dracula with a much pacier handling of this story." Film review aggregator Rotten Tomatoes reported an approval rating of 86%, based on seven reviews, with a rating average of 7.1/10.

References

Sources

External links 
 
 
 
 

1971 films
1970s historical horror films
1971 horror films
British historical horror films
Films about Jack the Ripper
Films about psychiatry
Films set in 1888
Films set in 1903
Films set in London
Films shot at Pinewood Studios
Hammer Film Productions horror films
Universal Pictures films
Films directed by Peter Sasdy
Films scored by Christopher Gunning
British exploitation films
British serial killer films
British psychological horror films
1970s English-language films
1970s British films